Susana Richa de Torrijos (born 22 October 1924) is a Panamanian educator, essayist, and politician.

Biography
She later qualified as a graduate in philosophy, a professor of Spanish at the University of Panama, and a PhD in philology at the Complutense University of Madrid.

As an educator, she was a Spanish teacher at the Normal School of Santiago, the Liceo de Señoritas, the Universidad Católica Santa María La Antigua, and the University of Panama. She has served as director of the Spanish Department, dean of the Faculty of Philosophy, Arts, and Education, member of the Editorial Board, member of the Board of Directors, academic vice-rector, and rector in charge of the University of Panama.

In the field of public education, Richa was National Supervisor of Spanish, Deputy Director and National Director of Secondary Education, National Director of Education, Vice Minister of Education, and Minister of Education of Panama from 1981 to 1984. As an essayist, she has published two works: Compendio de literatura hispanoamericana y panameña and La educación panameña, situación, problemas y soluciones.

As a politician, during the government of Ernesto Pérez Balladares she was appointed governor of Panamá Province from 1994 to 1998, when she resigned to be elected legislator of the National Assembly for the Democratic Revolutionary Party in 1999, and re-elected in 2004. She was vice president of the National Assembly on two occasions: 2001–2002 and 2006–2007.

In December 1999 Richa was separated from her position of professor at the Faculty of Humanities at the University of Panama under the Faúndes Law, which prohibited public officials from serving beyond age 75. She sued before the Third Chamber of the Supreme Court of Justice to reverse this, but was unsuccessful. On 20 August 2007, she co-sponsored an initiative which successfully repealed the Faúndes Law. In 2011 she received an award for 50 years of service with the University.

Richa is married to Hugo Torrijos (brother of General Omar Torrijos Herrera) and had one son, politician Hugo Torrijos Richa, who died in 2010. She is also the aunt of former President Martín Torrijos.

References

External links
 Biography at the National Library of Panama
 

1924 births
Complutense University of Madrid alumni
Deans (academic)
Women deans (academic)
Democratic Revolutionary Party politicians
Living people
Panamanian educators
People from Veraguas Province
University of Panama alumni
20th-century Panamanian women politicians
20th-century Panamanian politicians
Panamanian women academics
Panamanian academic administrators
Panamanian expatriates in Spain
21st-century Panamanian women politicians
21st-century Panamanian politicians